Braja Bhusan Gupta (1869–1940) was a Bengali nationalist politician, lawyer and active participant of the Indian freedom struggle.

Early life
Gupta was born in British India at Baniakhali village, in Domkal subdivision, Murshidabad district. His father's name was Binodlal Gupta. He joined the anti Partition of Bengal (1905) movement in 1905.

Career
Gupta was a Gandhian politician and social worker. He was an eminent lawyer of his time, with immense knowledge of philosophy and English Literature. He established Jatiya  Adarsha Vidyalaya in Baharampur. In 1921, District Congress Committee, Murshidabad was formed under his presidentship. Being the first president of the district committee of the Indian National Congress Gupta met top political leaders like Subhas Chandra Bose, Sarojini Naidu and even Mahatma Gandhi. He hosted Desbandhu Chittaranjan Das in spite of the police threat in his home. He presided over the Krishnath College School first  Jela Chatra Sammilani in 1927.

References

1869 births
1940 deaths
People from West Bengal
Bengali politicians
Indian National Congress politicians from West Bengal
Indian independence activists from West Bengal
People from Murshidabad district